Tarnak Farms refers to a former Afghan training camp near Kandahar, which served as a base to Osama bin Laden and his followers from 1998 to 2001.

9-11 hijackers believed to have trained at Tarnak Farms

Home to bin Laden 
In 1998, bin Laden moved his followers from Nazim Jihad to Tarnak Farms following Northern Alliance threats to attack Jalalabad.

Video of Tarnak Farms in 2000 made by the Central Intelligence Agency appeared to show bin Laden at the location. The administration of U.S. President Bill Clinton considered seizing bin Laden at Tarnak Farm, but the mission was never carried out due to concerns about killing innocent women and children, as well as legal disagreements within the administration.

The Tarnak Farms facility housed an al Qaida poison and explosive training laboratory and an advanced operational training camp. Operatives of al Qaida  received advanced operational training at the facility, including urban assault.

Tarnak Farm incident 

On April 17, 2002, a friendly fire incident occurred when four Canadian soldiers of the Princess Patricia's Canadian Light Infantry were killed at Tarnak Farms while conducting a live-fire training exercise. While flying an F-16, American pilot Harry Schmidt dropped a 227-kilogram laser-guided bomb on the Canadian position.

The bomb killed Canadian Forces Sgt Marc Leger, Cpl Ainsworth Dyer, Pte Richard Green and Pte Nathan Lloyd Smith and wounded eight CF soldiers.

See also
 Al-Damazin Farms

References

Al-Qaeda facilities
Osama bin Laden